Park Church runs the length of an entire city block in Elmira, New York. The church was constructed from 1874 through 1876, replacing its much smaller, wooden predecessor. It was designed by Horatio Nelson White. The design of the limestone and brick church is highly eclectic. Besides its architecture, the church is significant for its congregation of abolitionists and humanitarians. From 1854 until his death in 1900, Thomas Kennicott Beecher was the pastor of Park Church. Beecher, together with his twelve siblings including author Harriet Beecher Stowe, was brought up by liberal reformist clergyman Lyman Beecher.

Gallery

References

Churches in Elmira, New York
Churches on the National Register of Historic Places in New York (state)
Churches completed in 1876
19th-century churches in the United States
Churches in Chemung County, New York
National Register of Historic Places in Chemung County, New York